The dinar (Cyrillic script: динар) was the currency of the three Yugoslav states: the Kingdom of Yugoslavia (formerly the Kingdom of Serbs, Croats and Slovenes), the Socialist Federal Republic of Yugoslavia, and the Federal Republic of Yugoslavia between 1918 and 2003. The dinar was subdivided into 100 para (Cyrillic script: пара).

In the early 1990s, economic mismanagement made the government bankrupt and forced it to take money from the savings of the country's citizens. This caused severe and prolonged hyperinflation, which has been described as the worst in history. Large amounts of money were printed, with coins becoming redundant and inflation rates reaching over one billion per cent per year. This hyperinflation caused five revaluations between 1990 and 1994; in total there were eight distinct dinari. Six of the eight have been given distinguishing names and separate ISO 4217 codes. The highest denomination banknote was 500 billion dinars, which became worthless a fortnight after it was printed.

History

1920–41; Serbian dinar
Until 1918, the dinar was the currency of Serbia. It then became the currency of the Kingdom of Serbs, Croats and Slovenes, circulating alongside the krone in Croatia, Slovenia and Bosnia and Herzegovina, with 1 dinar = 4 kronen. The first coins and banknotes bearing the name of the Kingdom of Serbs, Croats and Slovenes were issued in 1920, until which time Serbian coins and banknotes circulated. In 1929, the name of the country changed to the Kingdom of Yugoslavia and this was reflected on the currency.

In 1931, an exchange rate of 56.4 dinara to the U.S. dollar was set, which changed to 44 dinara in 1933. In 1937, a tourist exchange rate of 250 dinara to the British pound was established.

World War II (1941–45)
In 1941, Yugoslavia was invaded and split up, with the dinar remaining currency in Nedić's Serbia as Serbian dinar). The kuna was introduced in Croatia and Bosnia and Herzegovina (Independent State of Croatia) at par with the dinar, whilst the Bulgarian lev, Italian lira and German Reichsmark circulated in those part of Yugoslavia occupied by these countries.

1945–65; Federation dinar (YUF)
In 1945, as Yugoslavia began to be reconstituted, the Yugoslav dinar replaced the Serbian dinar, Independent State of Croatia kuna and other occupation currencies, with the rates of exchanged being 1 Yugoslav dinar = 20 Serbian dinara = 40 kuna.

Yugoslavia was a founding member of the International Monetary Fund. At the time, other Communist countries avoided signing up to it. The dinar was initially pegged to the US dollar at a rate of 50 dinars to the dollar. By 1955, the peg had been depreciated to 300 dinars to the dollar, but this was only applicable to a limited number of transactions. For the vast majority of transactions, a system of multiple exchange rates with differing levels of government intervention applied. Depending on the transaction the system offered over 200 different exchange rates ranging from 600 or so dinars to the dollar to over 1,150. This multiple exchange rate system was abolished in 1961 and replaced with a single pegged rate of 750 dinars to the dollar.

1966–89; Hard dinar (YUD)
On 1 January 1966, the first of five revaluations took place, at a ratio of 100 to 1.

The revalued currency was initially pegged to the US dollar at a rate of 12.50 dinars to the dollar. In late 1971, this was revised to 17 dinars to the dollar. Following the Nixon Shock, Yugoslavia adopted a market exchange rate system. A foreign exchange market was established in Belgrade in which only banks could participate; this set the exchange rates for the entire country. This allowed the dinar to float (or perhaps more accurately, sink) more or less freely. Under this system, the exchange rate reached about 29 dinars to the dollar in 1981, 127 dinars to the dollar by 1984, and 457 dinars to the dollar by 1987.

Yugoslavia's chronic inflation was poorly managed. Between 1971 and 1991, Yugoslavia's annualized inflation was 76 percent. Only Brazil and Zaire had higher levels of inflation.

The large denomination coins were struck in nickel brass.

1990–92; Convertible dinar (YUN)

The second revaluation took place on 1 January 1990, at a ratio of 10,000 to 1. During this period, the constituent republics began to leave the Socialist Federal Republic of Yugoslavia. Four of the six republics declared independence and issued their own currencies shortly after. This was the last dinar that bore the coat of arms and the name of the "Socialist Federal Republic of Yugoslavia" in multiple languages.

Serbian enclaves in Bosnia and Herzegovina and in occupied territories in Croatia also issued currencies in dinar, equivalent to and revalued together with the Yugoslav dinar. These were the Krajina dinar and the Republika Srpska dinar.

July 1992 – September 1993; Reformed dinar (YUR)
The third revaluation took place on 1 July 1992, at a ratio of 10 to 1. Hyperinflation in the country began during this currency's period of circulation. This dinar was issued in the then Federal Republic of Yugoslavia, which consisted of the remaining republics of Serbia and Montenegro. People started to use foreign hard currency, such as Deutschmarks, to mitigate some of the problems of hyperinflation. (This federation split in 2006 and Montenegro currently uses the Euro as its currency, though it does not mint it.)

October–December 1993 dinar (YUO)

Yugoslavia re-denominated the dinar for the fourth time on 1 October 1993, at a ratio of 1 million to 1. This did not mitigate the hyperinflation, and the 1993 dinar (ISO 4217 code: YUO) lasted for only three months.

Coinage became redundant. The 1993 dinar had the largest denomination out of all incarnations of Yugoslav currency: the banknote, featuring Jovan Jovanović Zmaj had a face value of 500 billion dinara (right). Wages became worthless; if paid in cash, workers had to rush out and spend their wages before they lost their value overnight. Many businesses started to pay wages in goods instead, and a simple barter system developed. Businesses with good connections to politicians could still get access to hard currency. Some shops, instead of rewriting their prices several times a day, started pricing goods in "bods" (points), often equivalent to hard currency such as one Deutschmark. The winter of 1993 was particularly hard for pensioners; if a monthly pension was spent immediately, it was still barely enough to buy three litres of milk. Many people relied on connections to friends and family abroad (who could provide hard currency) or in the countryside (who could grow food).

1994 dinar (YUG)

Yugoslavia re-denominated the dinar for the fifth time on 1 January 1994, at a ratio of 1 billion to 1.

The 1994 dinar (ISO 4217 code: YUG) was the shortest-lived out of all incarnations of Yugoslav currency, as hyperinflation continued to intensify, and only one coin (1 dinar) was issued for it. Towards the end of the 1994 dinar, the National Bank overprinted and reissued 10 million dinara banknotes from the 1992 dinar (right).

1994–2003; Novi dinar (YUM)

On 24 January 1994, the novi dinar (nominative plural: novi dinari, Cyrillic script: нови динар, нови динари; genitive plural: novih dinara, Cyrillic: нових динара; novi means new) was introduced. This was not a revaluation of the dinar. Instead, the novi dinar was pegged at par to the Deutsche Mark. On the day of the introduction of the novi dinar, the exchange rate of the previous dinar to the Deutsche Mark, and, hence, to the novi dinar, was approximately 1 DM = 13 million dinara. Despite not being pegged to the newest currency, the previous dinar did not fall further in value, remaining at about 12 million "1994" dinar to the novi dinar. The overall impact of the hyperinflation was that 1 novi dinar equalled approximately 1.2 third (hard) dinara from before 1990, 1.2 Federation dinara, or 2.4  pre-war dinara. The "novi" portion of the name was abandoned in 2000.

In 2003, as Yugoslavia became the State Union of Serbia and Montenegro, the Yugoslav dinar in the constituent Republic of Serbia was replaced by the Serbian dinar (CSD) at par.

Replacement of the dinar

On 6 November 1999, Montenegro decided that, besides the Yugoslav dinar, the Deutsche Mark would also be an official currency. On 13 November 2000, the dinar was dropped in Montenegro and the Deutsche Mark (by that time defined in terms of the euro) became the only currency there. Deutsche Mark ceased to be a legal tender in Germany and was physically replaced by the euro on January 1, 2002, which is also when Montenegro unilaterally adopted the euro. In 2003, after the creation of Serbia and Montenegro, the dinar, by then only used in Serbia, was replaced by the Serbian dinar. In practice, introduction of Serbian dinar functioned as a name change with preservation of the at par value and essentially the same design solution except for the inscription. Old banknotes remained in official use in parallel with the new ones until January 1, 2007, while the National Bank of Serbia provided exchange of the old banknotes services until the end of 2012.

Coins

1920 dinar 

In 1920, the first coins were minted in the name of the Kingdom of Serbs, Croats and Slovenes. They were zinc 5 and 10 para and nickel-bronze 25 para. These were followed, in 1925, by nickel-bronze 50 para, 1 and 2 dinara. From 1931, coins were minted in the name of Yugoslavia, starting with silver 10 and 20 dinara, followed by silver 50 dinara in 1932. In 1938, aluminium-bronze 50 para, 1 and 2 dinara, nickel 10 dinara and reduced size, silver 20 and 50 dinara were introduced. These were the last coins issued before the Second World War.

1945 dinar 
In 1945, zinc 50 para, 1, 2 and 5 dinara were introduced, followed in 1953 by aluminium coins for the same denominations. In 1955, aluminium-bronze 10, 20 and 50 dinara were added.

1966 dinar 

In 1966, brass 5, 10, 20 and 50 para, and cupro-nickel 1 dinar coins (dated 1965) were introduced. In 1971, nickel-brass 2 and 5 dinara were introduced, followed by cupro-nickel 10 dinara in 1976. Production of 5, 10 and 20 para coins ceased in 1981, with bronze 25 and 50 para being introduced the following year. Nickel-brass 20, 50 and 100 dinara were introduced in 1985 and production of all coins less than 10 dinara stopped the next year. In 1988, brass 10, 20, 50 and 100 dinara were introduced. These four coins were issued until 1989.

1990 dinar 
In 1990, coins for 10, 20 and 50 para, 1, 2 and 5 dinara were introduced.  The highest two denominations were minted in small numbers in 1992, the other denominations having ceased production in 1991.

1992 dinar 
Coins were issued for this currency in 1992 in denominations of 1, 2, 5, 10 and 50 dinara. The 1, 2 and 5 dinara were bronze, whilst the 10 and 50 dinara were nickel-brass. The coins bore the state title "Yugoslavia" (Jugoslavija in the Latin alphabet and Југославија in Cyrillic) in its simplest form without any modifier.

1993 dinar 
Coins were issued in 1993 in denominations of 1, 2, 5, 10 and 50 dinara struck in nickel-brass, and 100 dinara struck in brass. Brass 500 dinara coins were also struck but not issued, most being remelted. The design of these coins was similar to that of coins of the fifth dinar, except that the sixth dinar coins bore the state title "FR Yugoslavia" (SR Jugoslavija in Latin and СР Југославија in Cyrillic).

1994 dinar 
Only one coin type was struck for this short-lived currency, a brass 1 dinar.

Novi dinar 
In 1994, brass 1 and 5 para, and nickel-brass 10 and 50 para, and 1 novi dinar were introduced. In 2000 the word novi was dropped from the currency and new, brass 50 para, 1, 2 and 5 dinara coins were introduced.

Banknotes

See also 

 Dinar
 Hyperinflation
 Kingdom of Yugoslavia
 Socialist Federal Republic of Yugoslavia
 Federal Republic of Yugoslavia
 Economy of the Socialist Federal Republic of Yugoslavia
 Alija Sirotanović

References 

 
 
 
 Yugoslavia n banknotes at Infotech 2003

External links 

 BBC News: Montenegro drops Yugoslav dinar

Modern obsolete currencies
Currencies of Europe
Dinar
Dinar
Serbia and Montenegro
Dinar
2003 disestablishments in Serbia and Montenegro
Dinar
Currencies introduced in 1918